Pont du Garigliano is a station in Line C of the Île-de-France's express suburban rail system, the Réseau Express Régional (RER). It is located in the 15th arrondissement of Paris, near the Seine. The station was originally named Boulevard Victor when it first opened, but it was renamed Boulevard Victor–Pont du Garigliano in 2006 for the opening of tramway Line 3, then renamed again in early 2010.

Adjacent station
Pont du Garigliano on Paris tramway Line 3.

See also
List of stations of the Paris RER
List of stations of the Paris Métro

External links

 

Buildings and structures in the 15th arrondissement of Paris
Railway stations in France opened in 1889
Réseau Express Régional stations
Railway stations in Paris